Alfred Mudge McCoy (October 7, 1899 – January 28, 1990) was an American football player and coach of football, basketball, and baseball. He served as head football coach at Northeastern University and Colby College and was the head baseball and men's basketball coach at Northeastern.

Early life
A native of Brookline, Massachusetts, McCoy attended Newton High School and Dean Academy. As a youth he excelled in football, swimming, and baseball. He was awarded a medal from the Massachusetts Humane Society for saving a girl from drowning in Crystal Lake. He attended the College of Holy Cross for one semester but had to leave due to poor health. He enrolled at Pennsylvania State University in 1921. He was a member of the Penn State team that played in the 1923 Rose Bowl. After the game, McCoy missed his midterms due to a blizzard that trapped him in his wife's home town of Syracuse, New York. He could not afford the $5 an exam fee to retake the test so he dropped out of school and worked on a railroad. McCoy resumed his education after recruited to play football at Lafayette College by coach Jock Sutherland.

Coaching
After graduating from Lafayette College in 1927, McCoy became the  coach for all athletics at Hackettstown High School in Hackettstown, New Jersey. In 1929 he joined the faculty of Northeastern University as an English professor and head baseball and men's basketball coach. In 1932, with the assistance of engineering school dean Carl Ell and athletic director Putty Parsons, McCoy established a freshman football team at Northeastern. The following year the school began its varsity football program. After a 1-3-1 first season, McCoy would not have a losing season as Northeastern's football coach.

In 1937, McCoy left Northeastern to become the head football coach at Colby College. In 1941, he was hired as backfield coach for the Harvard Crimson football team. In 1947 he became the chief scout for the Boston Yanks of the National Football League. McCoy's final coaching position came as an assistant at the University of Washington.

Later life
After his coaching career ended, McCoy moved to La Jolla, California, where he was a successful liquor store owner and a golf writer for the San Diego Tribune. In 1982 he was inducted into Northeastern's Hall of Fame. He died on January 31, 1990, in La Jolla. He was 90 years old.

Head coaching record

Football

References

1899 births
1990 deaths
American football ends
Colby Mules football coaches
Golf writers and broadcasters
Harvard Crimson football coaches
High school football coaches in New Jersey
Lafayette College alumni
Lafayette Leopards football players
Northeastern Huskies baseball coaches
Northeastern Huskies football coaches
Northeastern Huskies men's basketball coaches
Northeastern University faculty
Penn State Nittany Lions football players
People from La Jolla, San Diego
Sportspeople from Newton, Massachusetts
Washington Huskies football coaches